23 1/2 Hours' Leave is a lost 1919 American silent comedy film directed by Henry King and written by Mary Roberts Rinehart and Agnes Christine Johnston. The film stars Douglas MacLean, Doris May, Tom Guise, Maxfield Stanley, Wade Boteler, and Alfred Hollingsworth. The film was released on November 16, 1919, by Paramount Pictures. In 1937 MacLean produced a remake for Grand National Pictures.

Cast
Douglas MacLean as Sergeant William Gray
Doris May as Peggy Dodge
Tom Guise as General Dodge 
Maxfield Stanley as Table Sergeant
Wade Boteler as Mess Sergeant
Alfred Hollingsworth as Booth
N. Leinsky as A Spy
Jack Nelson as General's Aide

References

External links

1919 films
1910s English-language films
Silent American comedy films
Lost American films
1919 comedy films
Paramount Pictures films
Films directed by Henry King
American black-and-white films
American silent feature films
Films based on works by Mary Roberts Rinehart
1919 lost films
Lost comedy films
1910s American films